Julius Monzi Muia (born c. 1960), often referred to as Julius Muia, is a Kenyan accountant and financial expert, who serves as the Principal Secretary in the Kenyan Ministry of Finance, since 24 July 2019. Before he was appointed to his current position, he served as the Principal Secretary in the State Department for Planning.

Background and education
Muia was born in Kenya circa 1960s. He graduated from the University of Nairobi with a Bachelor of Commerce degree, majoring in Accounting. He also holds a Master of Business Administration degree and a Doctor of Philosophy in Finance, awarded by the same institution. He is a Certified Public Accountant and a Certified Public Secretary.

Career
In addition to his responsibilities as a public servant, he is a member of the teaching faculty as Strathmore Business School, in Nairobi, Kenya's capital city. His expertise in Kenya's public finances, stretches back approximately thirty years. In 2016, President Uhuru Kenyatta appointed him as the director general mandated to drive Kenya towards the realization of Vision 2030. He was transferred to the Finance Ministry on 24 July 2019, to replace Kamau Thugge, who was interdicted on corruption charges.

See also
 Ukur Yatani Kanacho
 Henry Rotich

References

External links
 Website of Kenya National Treasury

1960s births
Living people
Kamba people
Kenyan accountants
University of Nairobi alumni
Academic staff of Strathmore University